Simoncelli is an Italian surname. Notable people with the surname include:

 Andrew Simoncelli, American associate professor 
 Davide Simoncelli (born 1979), skier
 Daniele Simoncelli (born 1989), football player
 Eero Simoncelli, computational neuroscientist
 Girolamo Simoncelli (1522–1605), cardinal
 Girolamo Simoncelli (1817–1852), political and military leader
 Marco Simoncelli (1987–2011), motorcycle road racer
 Stefano Simoncelli (1946–2013), fencer
 Tania Simoncelli, scientist

Places 
 Misano World Circuit Marco Simoncelli, a motorsport racetrack in Misano Adriatico

Italian-language surnames
Patronymic surnames
Surnames from given names